Pembroke Pines Charter High School is a charter school in the United States. It is funded and administered by the City of Pembroke Pines, as opposed to the Broward County School Board.

In 2005, PPCHS received an A grade from the State of Florida. In 2007, PPCHS was named National Charter School of the year.

In 2014, PPCHS received an A grade from the State of Florida.

Student Traditions
A notable student tradition is the "Shirt throwing ceremony", occurring on the last class day for graduating seniors. The tradition dates back to the first graduating class. Students were upset that they had to wear uniforms unlike their classmates in other High Schools in the area, so conspired to run outside during the last day of class to throw their shirts into the trees surrounding the fountain in the center of campus. Ever since, every graduating class has participated in the shirt throwing ceremony. Afterwards, students run into the student parking lot to celebrate their last day at campus.

Notable alumni

Aramis Garcia, Major League Baseball player for the San Francisco Giants

References

External links 
Pembroke Pines Charter High School

High schools in Broward County, Florida
Charter schools in Florida
Public high schools in Florida
Pembroke Pines, Florida